Roland Iche (born March 3, 1947) is a French sprint canoer who competed in the mid-1970s. At the 1976 Summer Olympics in Montreal, he finished sixth in the C-1 1000 m event and ninth in the C-1 500 m event.

References
Sports-reference.com profile

1947 births
Canoeists at the 1976 Summer Olympics
French male canoeists
Living people
Olympic canoeists of France